Lipocosma forsteri is a moth in the family Crambidae. It is found in Bolivia.

References

Glaphyriinae
Moths described in 1964